T99 were a Belgian music group best known for their song "Anasthasia", which reached number 14 in the UK Singles Chart in May 1991.

T99 was initially Patrick DeMeyer, who released three solo works under this pseudonym. However, he heard Olivier Abbeloos (also of Quadrophonia) working on the track "Anasthasia", and suggested that they jointly release it as T99.

From then on, T99 was a duo made up of de Meyer and Abbeloos. They experienced brief success with "Anasthasia" and the follow-up, "Nocturne".  Their only album release, Children of Chaos, contained seventeen tracks which varied from hardcore techno to ambient techno, along with a spoken-word performance art piece. Their sound was sampled in tracks by 2 Unlimited, Kylie Minogue, and The Chemical Brothers.

"Anasthasia" appeared on the soundtrack to the 1999 film, Human Traffic.

De Meyer later went on to write material for Technotronic and 2 Unlimited, while Olivier Abbeloos started the label Holographic.

Discography

Albums
 Children of Chaos (1992)
 Complete Works: The Best of T99 (2000)

Singles

References

External links
 T99 at Discogs
 UK Top40 chart
 Musicmatic - for the release date
 Soundcloud - Olivier Abbeloos (aka T99)
 Holographic

Belgian techno music groups
Belgian house music groups
Belgian musical duos
Hardcore techno music groups